The Ventura County Fair is an annual event held each August in Ventura, California, United States, at Seaside Park, commonly called the Ventura County Fairgrounds. The fair includes an agricultural show, carnival rides, food booths, and nightly concerts.

History

The first Ventura County Fair took place in 1874 at the end of the local San Miguel Days harvest festival with attractions that included cockfighting, bullfighting and horse racing, as well as nightly balls. From 1877 it was held at Pierpont Bluffs, until 1891 when it was moved to Port Hueneme. The Seaside Park property that includes the Ventura County Fairgrounds was donated to the county in 1909 by E. P. Foster, and the fair began to be held there from 1914.

The fair was formerly held at the beginning of October, reflecting its focus on agriculture. In 1987 the event was moved to August in an effort to boost attendance by taking advantage of better weather.

The fair attracts more than 300,000 visitors each year. The County Fair parade was held on the nearby Main Street in downtown near the opening day for many years, but the parade is no longer held due to budget concerns.

During the fair, Ventura city police provide 24 hour security. The Ventura County Sheriff's Office Mounted Enforcement Unit assists with horseback deputies.

No fair was held in 1917–18 because of World War I, 1942–45 because of World War II and 2020–21 due to the COVID-19 pandemic.

Musical entertainment
Many notable artists and bands have played at the fair, including The Beach Boys, Jimi Hendrix Deep Purple, The B52’s, Smash Mouth, and Smokey Robinson.

References

External links

 

Ventura County, California
Fairs in California
Annual fairs
Annual events in California
Ventura, California
Tourist attractions in Ventura County, California
Festivals established in 1874
Agricultural shows in the United States